Tatyana Zakharova (born April 18, 1969) was a professional sprinter from Russia. She won a silver medal in the 4x400m relay at the 1995 World Championships in Athletics by virtue of running for her team in the preliminary rounds.

She also won a silver medal in the 4x400m at the 1994 Goodwill Games, this time running in the final.

International competitions

References 

Living people
1969 births
Russian female sprinters
European Athletics Championships medalists
World Athletics Championships athletes for Russia
World Athletics Championships medalists
Goodwill Games medalists in athletics
Competitors at the 1994 Goodwill Games